The Somali starling (Onychognathus blythii) is a species of starling in the family Sturnidae. It is found in Djibouti, Eritrea, Ethiopia, Somalia and Yemen.

Habitat
In the Degua Tembien district of north Ethiopia, the species can be observed in bushy and shrubby areas.

References

Somali starling
Birds of the Horn of Africa
Birds of the Arabian Peninsula
Somali starling
Taxonomy articles created by Polbot